Francisco Cuoco (born 29 November 1933) is a Brazilian actor. He became known for his roles as a heartthrob in telenovelas from Rede Globo, such as Selva de Pedra (1972), Pecado Capital (1975) and O Astro (1978), among others.

Biography
Cuoco was born in São Paulo, the son of the Italian fair trader Leopoldo Cuoco. He grew up in Brás neighborhood, with his sister Grácia and his mother Antonieta.

He worked during the day with his father at the fair and at night he studied, seeking a stable profession. He wanted to study Law, but when he got in touch with the School of Dramatic Art of Alfredo Mesquita, he decided to be a dramaturgy professional. He dropped out of law school and gave himself up to the artistic vocation.

After graduation, https://enciclopedia.itaucultural.org.br/busca?q=francisco+cuoco, Cuoco worked in several pieces of the companies Teatro Brasileiro de Comédia, Teatro dos Sete and Companhia Nídia Lícia. His first protagonist in the theater was with Werneck, in Nelson Rodrigues' play A Kiss on the Asphalt.
The first grand prize at the theater for the play Boeing Boeing.

In 1962, Cuoco made his feature film debut, a supporting character in Pedro and Paulo. In 1968, he starred in Anuska, Mannequin and Woman (by Francisco Ramalho Jr.) :pt:Anuska, Manequim e Mulher

With intense theater production in the 1950s and 1960s, Francisco Cuoco joined television, where he performed teleteatres on extinct TV Tupi, and soap operas on TV Excelsior. He was later hired by Globo Television Network, where he participated in more than 100 productions https://memoriaglobo.globo.com/perfil/francisco-cuoco/trabalhos-na-globo/

Filmography

Television 
 2020 - Salve-se Quem Puder .... Himself (special participation)
 2018 - Segundo Sol .... Nestor Maranhão 
 2018 - Pega Pega .... Mr. Chico (special participation)
 2016 - Sol Nascente .... Gaetano De Angeli
 2015 - I Love Paraisópolis .... Evaristo Mateus Salsete, Sr. (special participation)
 2014 - Boogie Oogie .... Vicente Santos
 2014 - A Grande Família .... Oduvaldo Carrara (1 episode)
 2014 - Amor à Vida ....Rubão Carvalho (special participation)
 2012 - A Vida da Gente .... Mariano Vilaça (special participation)
 2011 - O Astro .... Ferragus
 2010 - Passione .... Olavo da Silva
 2010 - A Princesa e o Vagabundo .... Germain
 2008 - Negócio da China.... Evandro Fontanera
 2008 - Dicas de Um Sedutor....Geraldo
 2008 - Dança dos Famosos (reality show - Domingão do Faustão)
 2008 - Duas Caras .... Ele mesmo (participação especial)
 2007 - Casos e Acasos .... Feldman / Edgar
 2007 - Toma Lá, Dá Cá .... Dr. Pauleta (episódio "Galinha que come pedra")
 2007 - Amazônia, de Galvez a Chico Mendes .... Augusto (terceira fase)
 2006 - Cobras e Lagartos .... Omar Pasquim (Vicentino Pereira)
 2005 - América .... Zé Higino (José da Silva Higino)
 2004 - Da Cor do Pecado .... Pai Gaudêncio
 2003 - Como Educar Seus Pais (especial)
 2003 - Agora É que São Elas .... pai de Juca Tigre (participação)
 2002 - A Grande Família .... Oduvaldo Carrara (pai de Agostinho)
 2001 - O Clone .... padre Matiolli
 2001 - As Filhas da Mãe .... Fausto Cavalcante
 2001 - Sai de Baixo .... Lindovando Batista (participação)
 1998 - Dona Flor e Seus Dois Maridos .... Garcia
 1998 - Pecado Capital .... Salviano Lisboa
 1997 - A Justiceira (seriado) .... pai de Diana
 1997 - Malhação .... Orestes
 1996 - Quem É Você? .... Nelson Maldonado
 1995 - A Próxima Vítima - Hélio Ribeiro
 1994 - Tropicaliente .... Gaspar Velasquez
 1992 - Deus Nos Acuda .... Otto Bismark
 1990 - Lua Cheia de Amor .... Diego Miranda / Esteban Garcia
 1989 - O Salvador da Pátria .... Severo Toledo Blanco
 1987 - O Outro .... Paulo Della Santa / Denizard de Matos
 1983 - Eu Prometo .... Lucas Cantomaia
 1982 - Sétimo Sentido .... Tião Bento
 1981 - Obrigado Doutor (seriado) .... Rodrigo Junqueira
 1979 - Os Gigantes .... Chico (Francisco Rubião)
 1979 - Feijão Maravilha .... delegado (special participation)
 1977 - O Astro .... Herculano Quintanilha
 1976 - Duas Vidas .... Victor Amadeu
 1976 - Saramandaia .... Tiradentes (special participation)
 1975 - Pecado Capital .... Carlão (José Carlos Moreno)
 1975 - Cuca Legal .... Mário Barroso
 1973 - O Semideus .... Alex Garcia
 1972 - Selva de pedra .... Cristiano Vilhena
 1971 - O Cafona .... Gilberto Athayde
 1970 - Assim na Terra como no Céu .... Vítor Mariano
 1969 - Sangue do Meu Sangue .... Carlos e Lúcio
 1968 - Legião dos Esquecidos .... Felipe
 1966 - Redenção .... dr. Fernando Silveira
 1966 - Almas de Pedra .... Felipe
 1965 - Renúncia .... Miguel
 1965 - O Pecado de Cada Um .... Daniel
 1965 - Os Quatro Filhos .... Luís
 1964 - Banzo .... Mário
 1964 - Marcados pelo Amor .... Victor

Cinema 
1960 - Grande Sertão
1961 - Pedro e Paulo
1968 - Anuska, Manequim e Mulher
1998 - Traição
1999 - Gêmeas
2000 - Um Anjo Trapalhão
2001 - Os Xeretas
2005 - Cafundó
2006 - Didi - O Caçador de Tesouros

Theater 
 1955 - O Anúncio Feito à Maria
 1956 - As Três Irmãs
 1957 - A Bilha Quebrada
 1957 - Os Apaixonados Pueris
 1957 - A Madona de Éfeso
 1958 - A Pedreira das Almas
 1959 - A Senhoria
 1959 - Quando se Morre de Amor
 1959 - Romanoff e Julieta
 1960 - Cristo Proclamado
 1960 - Com a Pulga atrás da Orelha
 1960 - Mambembe
 1961 - O Beijo no Asfalto
 1961 - O Médico Volante
 1961 - O Velho Ciumento
 1962 - O Homem, a Besta e a Virtude
 1962 - Panorama Visto da Ponte
 1964 - Boeing Boeing
 1965 - Boeing-Airbus
 1967 - A Infidelidade ao Alcance de Todos
 1969 - O Assalto
 1985 - Hedda Gabler
 2005 - Os Três Homens Baixos
 2006 - O Último Bolero
 2008 - Circuncisão em Nova York
 2009 - Deus É Química
 2013 - Uma Vida no Teatro

Awards and nominations

APCA Awards

Art Quality Brazil Awards

Best of the Year – Globe Awards

Brasília Film Festival

Contigo! Awards

Guarani Film Awards

Press Trophy

References

External links 

 

1933 births
Living people
Male actors from São Paulo
Brazilian people of Italian descent
Brazilian male telenovela actors
Brazilian male film actors
Brazilian male stage actors
20th-century Brazilian male actors
21st-century Brazilian male actors